"Christmas at Ground Zero" is an original song by "Weird Al" Yankovic, the tenth and final track on his 1986 album, Polka Party! and the final single from the album, released just in time for the 1986 Christmas season. The song is a style parody of Phil Spector-produced Christmas songs.

Lyrics and recording

"Christmas at Ground Zero" is an upbeat song that juxtaposes stereotypical Christmas activities with attempts to survive a nuclear holocaust (e.g., Yankovic sings about "dodg[ing] debris as we trim the tree underneath a mushroom cloud"). Musically, the song is a style parody of A Christmas Gift for You from Phil Spector, a Christmas compilation album produced by Phil Spector and featuring The Ronettes, The Crystals and Darlene Love; Yankovic produced the song complete with Spector's trademark "big, glossy Wall of Sound production".

The song was the result of Yankovic's label, Scotti Brothers Records, insisting that Yankovic record a Christmas album. However, after Yankovic presented the song to his label, they relented, because it was "a little different from what they were expecting." After the song was written and recorded, Yankovic wanted to release the song as a commercial single, but Scotti Bros. refused. Undeterred, he used his own money to create a low-budget music video made mostly out of stock footage. Eventually, Scotti Bros. released the song as a promotional single and was released commercially.

September 11 controversy

The expression "ground zero" was largely connected with nuclear explosions at the time this song was written. After the September 11, 2001 attacks, the term was co-opted by the media to refer to the large hole over which the World Trade Center towers that were destroyed in the attacks had stood. Due to the new associations of the title, Yankovic's song received far-reduced airplay since 2001, but continues to appear in novelty programming such as the Dr. Demento show. Yankovic later said:

The sad part is, I can’t really play the song live anymore because too many people misunderstand the connotations of Ground Zero. It’s not a reference to 9/11, obviously. It was written in 1987  when 'ground zero' just meant the epicenter of a nuclear attack.

Music video

The music video was made during the 1980s at the time of the Cold War. This music video was also Yankovic's directing debut. The video is a montage of old film, television, and news footage, including a pre-presidential Ronald Reagan, capped off with a live-action scene of Yankovic and some carolers wearing gas masks, singing with rubble around them. This live action finale was filmed in the Bronx, New York, in an economically devastated area that looked like a bomb had gone off. The video was edited with Yankovic by Darren Bramen, with final edits and effects by John Peterson.

Yankovic stated that the record label did not want to pay for this video to be made, due to associating a nuclear disaster with the holidays. Yankovic instead funded production of the video himself. In the late 1980s, the song was a staple on MTV during the holiday season.

Reception

The song has been well received. Julio Diaz of the Pensacola News Journal wrote "While 'Grandma Got Run Over By a Reindeer' got old decades ago, this is one musical dose of sick holiday humor that hasn't lost its novelty." He went on to compliment the music video as well, calling it "a lot of fun". Joey Green, in his book Weird and Wonderful Christmas, named the track one of "The Weirdest Christmas Songs of All Time". The song, according to Yankovic himself, is a fan-favorite.

Track listing

 "Christmas at Ground Zero" – 3:08
 "One of Those Days" – 3:18

See also

 "The Night Santa Went Crazy", a later Christmas song by Yankovic, from his album Bad Hair Day (1996)
 List of singles by "Weird Al" Yankovic
 List of songs by "Weird Al" Yankovic

References

Works cited

External links
 "Christmas at Ground Zero" music video on Youtube

"Weird Al" Yankovic songs
Songs about nuclear war and weapons
1986 singles
1986 songs
American Christmas songs
Anti-war songs
Music videos directed by "Weird Al" Yankovic
Songs written by "Weird Al" Yankovic
Black comedy music
Christmas novelty songs
Satirical songs
Apocalyptic fiction
Song recordings with Wall of Sound arrangements
Scotti Brothers Records singles
Music controversies